Experimental Biology and Medicine may refer to

Experimental Biology and Medicine (Karger journal), published from 1967 to 1987 by Karger
Experimental Biology and Medicine (Society for Experimental Biology and Medicine journal), published from 2001 onwards by Sage Publications on behalf of the Society for Experimental Biology and Medicine